The following elections occurred in the year 1927.

 1927 Chilean presidential election
 1927 Finnish parliamentary election
 1927 Guatemalan Constitutional Assembly election
 1927 Lebanese general election
 1927 Liberian general election
 1927 Nicaraguan parliamentary election
 1927 Norwegian parliamentary election
 1927 Salvadoran presidential election

Europe
 Austrian legislative election
 Free City of Danzig parliamentary election
 Germany: 
 Brunswick Landtag election 
 Hamburg state election 
 Bulgarian parliamentary election
 Finnish parliamentary election
 Icelandic parliamentary election
 Ireland: 
 June 1927 Irish general election
 September 1927 Irish general election
 1927 Dublin County by-election
 1927 Dublin North by-election
 1927 Dublin South by-election
 Kingdom of Serbs, Croats and Slovenes parliamentary election
 Maltese general election
 Norwegian parliamentary election
 Romanian general election
 Soviet Union legislative election
 Turkish general election
 Zagreb local elections

United Kingdom
 1927 Bosworth by-election
 Brixton by-election
 Canterbury by-election
 1927 Combined Scottish Universities by-election
 1927 Leith by-election
 1927 Southwark North by-election
 1927 Westbury by-election

North America

Canada
 1927 Edmonton municipal election
 1927 Manitoba general election
 1927 Prince Edward Island general election
 1927 Quebec general election
 1927 Toronto municipal election

United States
 1927 New York state election

Oceania

Australia
 1927 New South Wales state election
 1927 South Australian state election

New Zealand
 1927 Raglan by-election

See also
 :Category:1927 elections

1927
Elections